Muhammad ibn Abi Bakr al-Farisi (d. 1278/1279), an Iranian Rasulid astronomer and astrologer born in Aden. He is the author of al-Tuḥfa, which includes a treatise containing important information for the history of Islamic astronomy and its connection with the religion of Islam.

Notes

References 
  (PDF version)
 Muḥammad ibn Abī Bakr al-Fārisī and 8 works of Astrology, Astronomical Tables/zījes and Astronomy: General, on Islamic Scientific Manuscripts Initiative

13th-century Iranian astronomers
Scientists who worked on qibla determination
1278 deaths
Year of birth unknown
People from Aden